The 1997 Ukrainian Cup Final is a football match that took place at the NSC Olimpiyskiy on May 25, 1997. The match was the 6th Ukrainian Cup Final and it was contested by FC Shakhtar Donetsk and FC Dnipro Dnipropetrovsk. The 1997 Ukrainian Cup Final was the fifth to be held in the Ukrainian capital Kyiv. Shakhtar won by a single goal netted by Serhiy Atelkin in the 36th minute.

There also were a couple of yellow cards issued at this game, both of them to Shakhtar players: Potskhveria and Hennadiy Orbu.

Road to Kyiv 

Both teams started from the first round of the competition (1/16). Shakhtar, if not considering their first game in Mariupol, had some difficulties along the way meeting resistance from every team. Especially surprising was the face-off with Vorskla Poltava which almost revenged the miners for the face-slap from two years previously. In the semi-final Shakhtar defeated the Armymen which, alas, managed to show no teeth in their second game. Dnipro impressed when it easily defeated the two-time winners of the tournament, Chornomorets Odessa.

Match details

Match statistics

See also
 Ukrainian Cup 1996-97

References

External links 
 Calendar of Matches - Schedule of the 1996-97 Ukrainian Cup on the Ukrainian Soccer History web-site (ukrsoccerhistory.com). 

Cup Final
Ukrainian Cup finals
Ukrainian Cup Final 1997
Ukrainian Cup Final 1997
Sports competitions in Kyiv